Franklin Lars "Jake" Flake (August 4, 1935 – June 8, 2008) was an American politician who served as a Senator in the Arizona State Legislature from 2005 until his death. Previous to his term as State Senator, he served as a Representative in the Arizona Legislature, including a stint as Speaker of the House.

Early life and education 
Flake was born in Snowflake, Arizona to Virgil Maeser Flake and Gerda Flake, née Hendrickson. He was born Franklin Lars Flake, but his father soon gave him the nickname "Jake", and that is what he was called most of his life. He graduated from Arizona State University in 1960.

Career 
Flake was a cattle rancher by profession, and he and three of his brothers raised the Beefmaster breed.

After graduating from college, he returned to Snowflake and lived there until his election to the Arizona House of Representatives in 1996, after which he divided his time between Snowflake and Phoenix. Flake served a mission for his church among the Navajo in the state of Arizona. Previous to entering state politics, he served as president of the Snowflake Arizona Stake of The Church of Jesus Christ of Latter-day Saints.

Personal life 
He married Mary Louise Skouson in 1959; they had 13 children and 53 (as of June 11, 2008) grandchildren. Mary Louise was an excellent musician who played French horn in the Silver Creek Symphony, as well as playing the solo piano part with that group on Gershwin’s Rhapsody in Blue. They were members of the Church of Jesus Christ of Latter-day Saints. He was an uncle to former U.S. Senator and U.S. Representative Jeff Flake.

Flake died on the morning of June 8, 2008. He had been at home recovering from a horseback riding accident. He was succeeded in the Arizona Senate by Sylvia Allen.

References

External links

 Biography from the Arizona legislature

1935 births
2008 deaths
Republican Party members of the Arizona House of Representatives
Republican Party Arizona state senators
American Mormon missionaries in the United States
20th-century Mormon missionaries
People from Snowflake, Arizona
Speakers of the Arizona House of Representatives
20th-century American politicians